Mineral spas are spa resorts developed around naturally occurring mineral springs. Like seaside resorts, they are mainly used recreationally although they also figured prominently in prescientific medicine.

Origins 

Spas were used for millennia for their purported healing or healthful benefits to those wealthy enough or close enough to partake of their waters. This was called a mineral cure and gave let to such phrases as taking a cure and taking the waters. There has always been a mixture of recreational and medicinal connotations involved, from rest and relaxation, stress relief, and convalescence to more specific notions such as humorism. These phrases are still sometimes used today as a euphemism for one trying to kick a drug dependency.

In many cases, mineral spas were located in mountainous locales that gave an additional excuse to leave the drudgery of a hot house in warm weather during summer's onset and were seasonally populated by the well-to-do. They eventually became early vacation spots with the counter-Victorian work ethic 'rationale' of health as an excuse to have fun and mix with one's peers in recreation.

Subsequently, many such became the seed stock for today's modern vacation resorts. Locations such as Steamboat Springs, Vail, St Moritz, Mineral Wells first became popular for the questionable health benefits of mineral or soda-water soaks, ingestion, and clean outs during the hey-day of patent medicines and backward medical knowledge.  United States President Franklin Delano Roosevelt suffered a paralytic illness, and regularly visited Warm Springs and other hot springs for restorative soaks. While his cousin Theodore Roosevelt became known as a manly-man of incredible endurance, he was a sickly child suffering from asthma and 'took cures' periodically in an attempt to gain better health.

The name "spa" comes from the Belgian town Spa.

Evolution of the resort

As the Victoria era came to an end, the influences of the industrial revolution created more and more varied members of the upper middle class.  The concepts of vacationing, tourism, and travel became less the property of the old monied classes, and shared by an increasing population base of those who could afford holiday trips like the rich.

Such adventures had much allure in the days before any audio-visual entertainments outside a live orchestra. Thus, the spas began attracting an increasing number of local patrons as well as those from afar just at the time when the burgeoning numbers were able to take advantage of the automobile and the now extensive railways throughout most all of Europe and the United States.

The spa towns already had infrastructure and attractions in place to assuage such desires, and the modern tourist trip began to take its familiar form. Other technologies came into play (skis, ski boats, etc.)

Notable mineral spa and spring areas

Africa

South Africa 
 Caledon, Western Cape
 Tshipise, Limpopo
 Bela Bela, Limpopo
 Badplaas, Mpumalanga

Asia

China 
 Anshan, Liaoning

India 
Vajreshwari Temple, Maharashtra

Japan 
 Beppu, Ōita
 Gero, Gifu

South Korea 
 Yuseong-gu, Daejeon

Turkey 
 Pamukkale, Denizli Province

Europe

Albania 

 Spa, Peshkopi

Armenia 

 Arzni
 Bjni
 Hankavan
 Jermuk

Austria 
 Bad Fischau-Brunn

Azerbaijan 

 İstisu, Kalbajar

Belgium 
Spa (municipality)

Bosnia and Herzegovina 

 Slatina

Bulgaria 
 Bankya
 Banya, Plovdiv Province
 Dobrinishte
 Hisarya
 Kyustendil
 Narechen
 Pavel Banya
 Sandanski
 Sapareva Banya
 Varshets
 Velingrad

Czech Republic 
 Karlovy Vary
 Luhačovice
 Mariánské Lázně

France 
 Aix-les-Bains
 Dax
 Évian-les-Bains
 Tercis-les-Bains
 Vichy

Georgia 
 Borjomi

Germany 
 Baden-Baden
 Bad Neuenahr
 Wiesbaden

Hungary 
 Budapest
 Hévíz

Poland 
 Ciechocinek
 Krynica-Zdrój
 Nałęczów

Romania 
 Baile Felix
 Baile Govora
 Baile Herculane
 Baile Tusnad
 Vatra Dornei

Russia 
 Belokurikha, Altai
 Nalchik, Kabardino-Balkarian Republic
 Svetlogorsk, Kaliningrad Oblast
 , Karelia
 Goryachy Klyuch, Krasnodar Krai
 Yeysk, Krasnodar Krai
 Staraya Russa, Novgorod Oblast
 Kislovodsk, Stavropol Krai
 Pyatigorsk, Stavropol Krai
 Yessentuki, Stavropol Krai
 Zheleznovodsk, Stavropol Krai

Serbia 
 Bukovička Banja
 Vrnjačka Banja

Slovakia 
 Korytnica kúpele
 Piešťany
 Trenčianske Teplice

Slovenia 
 Radenci

Spain 
 A Toxa
 Caldes de Malavella
 Lanjarón
 Panticosa
 Zestoa

Sweden 

 Ramlösa hälsobrunn

Switzerland 
 Saint-Moritz

United Kingdom

England
Askern
Bath
Boston Spa
Buxton
Cheltenham
Church Stretton
Dorton Spa
Droitwich Spa
Epsom
Harrogate
Ilkley
Knaresborough
Malvern
Matlock
Matlock Bath
Royal Leamington Spa
Royal Tunbridge Wells
Scarborough; see also The Spa, Scarborough
Shap
Shearsby
Tenbury Wells
Woodhall Spa

Ukraine 
 Yalta

Americas

Brazil 
 Caxambu

Canada 
 Harrison Hot Springs

Costa Rica 
 Tabacón

Jamaica 
 Milk River Bath, Clarendon

Mexico 
 Agua Hedionda

Uruguay 
 Termas del Arapey

United States 
 Desert Hot Springs, California
 French Lick, Indiana
 Eureka Springs, Arkansas
 Hot Springs, Arkansas
 Mineral Wells, Texas
 Mount Clemens, Michigan
 Poland Spring, Maine 
 Saratoga Springs, New York
 Sharon Springs, New York
 Steamboat Springs, Colorado
 Warm Springs, Georgia
 Warm Springs, Virginia
 Berkeley Springs, West Virginia

Oceania and Australia

Australia 
 Hepburn Springs
 Daylesford
 Peninsula Hot Springs, Victoria

New Zealand 
 Hanmer Springs
 Rotorua

References

Outdoor recreation
Balneotherapy
Mineral
Hydrotherapy
Spa towns